Sea Warrior Creek is a stream in the U.S. state of Alabama.

"Sea Warrior" is the result of a name corrupted from the Choctaw language (Isawaya) purported to mean "crouching deer".

References

Rivers of Alabama
Rivers of Choctaw County, Alabama